Tolus is a genus of harvestman in family Phalangodidae with the sole described species Tolus appalachius. It is only found in Tennessee.

References
 's Biology Catalog: Phalangodidae

Harvestmen
Endemic fauna of Tennessee
Monotypic arachnid genera